Lusigny is a commune in the Allier department in central France.

Geography
Lusigny is a town located in the Auvergne-Rhône-Alpes region, in the department of Allier. Lusigny is located in the canton of Dompierre-sur-Besbre. Its inhabitants are known as the Lusignois in French.

Population

See also
Communes of the Allier department

References

Communes of Allier
Allier communes articles needing translation from French Wikipedia